Wasted Time(s) may refer to:

Songs
"Wasted Time" (Fuel song), 2007
"Wasted Time" (Keith Urban song), 2016
"Wasted Time" (Kings of Leon song), 2003
"Wasted Time" (Skid Row song), 1991
"Wasted Time" (Vance Joy song), 2014
"Wasted Times" (The Weeknd song), 2018
"Wasted Time", by Bret Michaels from Custom Built, 2010
"Wasted Time", by Cloves, 2018
"Wasted Time", by the Eagles from Hotel California, 1976
"Wasted Time", by Europe from Wings of Tomorrow, 1984
"Wasted Time", by Heavenly from Virus, 2006
"Wasted Time", by Holy Knights from Between Daylight and Pain, 2012
"Wasted Time", by Lionel Richie from Renaissance, 2000

Other uses
The Wasted Times, a 2016 Chinese-Hong Kong film

See also
Wasting Time (disambiguation)
Wasting My Time (disambiguation)
"Waste Time", a song by the Fire Theft from their self-titled album